"Donald Where's Your Troosers?" is a comic song about a Scotsman who wears a kilt rather than trousers. It was written by Andy Stewart with music by Neil Grant. When performed by Andy Stewart and the White Heather Group, it was a hit in 1960, reaching number 37 in the UK Singles Chart, and number 1 in the Canadian CHUM Charts. When re-released in 1989, it became an even bigger hit, reaching number 4 in the UK.

Stewart wrote the song in 10 minutes while he sat, trouserless, in the lavatory of a recording studio.  The song tells of a rustic Scotsman who wears the kilt in defiance of the shock this causes to polite society such as well-spoken ladies on the London Underground. The music supports the theme in its chord progression, which shifts from the double tonic of Scottish music to a V-i cadence more typical of highbrow music. As performed by Andy Stewart, a verse is also performed in the style of Elvis Presley to provide yet another amusing clash of cultures.

The re-release happened when BBC DJ Simon Mayo played the song on The Radio 1 Breakfast Show in November 1989 and then responded to listener's requests for replays, "We were in the mood for novelty nonsense, so we kept playing it". Sonet Records then quickly arranged a deal with EMI to release the song on the Stone label as a Christmas single – a market in which novelty songs often did well. Mayo continued to give it much airplay and the song was number 4 in the UK Singles Chart at Christmas behind Jive Bunny's "Let's Party" and Band Aid II's "Do They Know It's Christmas?".  Stewart was not expecting this renewed success:

The song was ranked 17th in a poll of the UK's favourite comic songs in 2009. It was performed as part of the opening ceremony for the 2014 Commonwealth Games.

In popular culture
 One headline about the furore over allegations of Donald Duck being banned in Finland for not wearing trousers was "Donald, Where Are Your Trousers?"
 The song appeared as one of the options in a detour which contestants in The Amazing Race 33 were invited to perform.
 A slow cover of this song appeared in season 2 episode 21 of Terminator: The Sara Connor Chronicles. https://www.imdb.com/title/tt1329932/

References

Novelty songs
Scottish songs
1960 singles
1989 singles
EMI Records singles
1960 songs
Songs about Scotland